Morozovka is a rural locality (a khutor) in Beloroyevskoye Rural Settlement, Podgorensky District, Voronezh Oblast, Russia. The population was 107 as of 2010. There are 4 streets.

Geography 
Morozovka is located 24 km northeast of Podgorensky (the district's administrative centre) by road. Vitebsk is the nearest rural locality.

References 

Rural localities in Podgorensky District